These are the extremes in weather records for Michigan, a state in the Great Lakes region of the Midwestern United States.

Temperature

Overall

By month

Heat wave

Precipitation

Rain

Snow

Tornadoes

References

Weather records
Lists of weather records
American records
Weather records